Geitoneura acantha, the ringed xenica or eastern ringed xenica, is a species of butterfly belonging to the family Nymphalidae. The species was first described by Edward Donovan as Papilio acantha in 1805. It occurs in the south-eastern mainland of Australia.

References

Satyrini
Butterflies of Australia
Butterflies described in 1805